Mount Midnight  is a peak nearly  high, standing on the north side of Tucker Glacier,  west of Shadow Bluff, in the Admiralty Mountains of Antarctica. It was climbed by a geological team of the New Zealand Geological Survey Antarctic Expedition in January 1958, and was named by them in association with Mount Shadow, just eastward, and Shadow Bluff.

References

Mountains of Victoria Land
Borchgrevink Coast